Patrik Ouředník (in French sometimes known as Patrick; born 23 April 1957 in Prague) is a Czech author and translator, living in France.

Ouředník spent his youth in Prague. In 1984 he emigrated to France, where he first worked as a chess consultant, then as a librarian. From 1986 to 1998 he served as editor and head of the literature section of the quarterly L'Autre Europe. In 1992 he was instrumental in founding the Free University of Nouallaguet, and he has lectured there since 1995.

Translator from French into Czech (François Rabelais, Alfred Jarry, Raymond Queneau, Samuel Beckett, Henri Michaux, Boris Vian, Claude Simon...) and from Czech into French (Bohumil Hrabal, Vladimír Holan, Jan Skácel, Miroslav Holub, Jiří Gruša, Ivan Wernisch...), Ouředník is also the author of various literary texts. His production is characterized by an interest in curious and surprising aspects of life, by an experimentation in exploring language, literary forms and genres, and by a constant attention to ludic aspects. Words, events, social stereotypes, readings, the story itself are continuously mixed up in a lucid, hilarious game of intertextuality as witnessed, for example, in three of his novels translated into English: Europeana. A Brief History of the Twentieth Century, The Opportune Moment, 1855, and Case Closed.

Europeana. A Brief History of the Twentieth Century (Dalkey Archive Press, 2005)

Book of the Year in the Czech Republic (Lidové noviny), Top Shelf in United States (The Village Voice), translated into 33 languages (2017), Europeana is a mordant deconstruction of historical memory where all references—events, slogans, persons, dates—accumulate and then return, vague and vacillating, to alienate the reader.

The Opportune Moment, 1855 (Dalkey Archive Press, 2011).

Book of the Year in Italy (La Stampa). In 1855, a group of anarchists, communists, and libertarians leaves Europe for Brazil in order to establish the colony Fraternitas, based on the principles of community and egalitarianism. The project collapses, as does the linear narration.

Case Closed (Dalkey Archive Press, 2010)

Seemingly a detective novel, set in a dreamlike post-Communist Prague. Revolving around a fistful of harmless, humorous retirees who sit and chat on the local park bench, the plot is replete with mysterious hints, crippled language, unsolved crimes, at least one suspicious suicide, and a bizarre rape. Who, where, when, how, why?

Works 
 The Rough-book of the Czech Language: A Dictionary of Unconventional Czech (Šmírbuch jazyka českého. Slovník nekonvenční češtiny), Paris, 1988.
 Or (Anebo), Prague, 1992.
 The Extraordinary Adventures of Prince Chicory... (O princi Čekankovi, jak putoval za princeznou...), Prague, 1993.
 And There Is No New Thing under the Sun: A Dictionary of Biblical and Parabiblical Expressions (Aniž jest co nového pod sluncem. Slova, rčení a úsloví biblického původu), Prague, 1994.
 Year Twenty-Four (Rok čtyřiadvacet), Prague,1995.
 If I Don’t Say So (Neřkuli),  Prague, 1996.
 In Search of Lost Language (Hledání ztraceného jazyka), Prague, 1997.
 112 Ways to Roll a Barrel of Oil (Des 112 façons desquelles on peut faire rouler un tonneau à huile) (Limoges 1999, with Jiří Pelán).
 The Key Is at the Bar (Klíč je ve výčepu), Prague, 2000.
 55 Types of Laced Boots to Keep Your Feet Warm in Winter (Des 55 espèces de brodequines dont on peut s'entourer les pieds en hiver) (Limoges 2001, with Jiří Pelán).
 Europeana: A Brief History of the Twentieth Century (Europeana: Stručné dějiny dvacátého věku), Prague, 2001.
 House of a Barefoot Man (Dům bosého) Prague, 2004.
 The Opportune Moment, 1855 (Příhodná chvíle, 1855), Prague, 2006.
 Case Closed (Ad acta), Prague, 2006.
 It Was Utopus Who Made Me an Island (Utopus to byl, kdo učinil mě ostrovem), Prague 2010.
 Today and After Tomorrow (Dnes a pozítří), Prague 2012.
 On the Free Exercise of Language (Svobodný prostor jazyka), Prague 2013. Winner of the Tom Stoppard Prize.
 A History of France: For Our Dearly Departed (Histoire de France. À notre chère disparue), Paris 2014 (in French).
 The End of the World Might Not Have Taken Place (La fin du monde n'aurait pas eu lieu), Paris 2017 (in French).

References

External links 

 
 Jonathan Bolton: Reading Patrik Ourednik, Context
 The Village Voice, Top Shelf 2005
 The New York Times
 Complete Review (1)
 Complete Review (2)
  The Transcript Review
 The Asylum
 The Mumpsimus
 Interview by Céline Bourhis
 Interview by Marika Piva

1957 births
Living people
Czech translators
Czech novelists
Czech male novelists
Czech poets
Czech male poets